Mars Bluff is an unincorporated community in Florence County, South Carolina, United States that bears the distinction of having been inadvertently bombed with a nuclear weapon by the United States Air Force.

History
Originally known as Marr's Bluff during the American Revolution, the area west of the Great Pee Dee River eventually became known as Mars Bluff at some point before the American Civil War.  Near the end of the American Civil War, the Mars Bluff Naval Yard was established, one of many inland Confederate naval yards.

Nuclear bomb accident

On March 11, 1958 a U.S. Air Force B-47 Stratojet with a nuclear payload left for nuclear training exercises for war preparations in the United Kingdom and South Africa. The navigator mistakenly pulled the emergency release pin which resulted in the bomb falling out of the plane. Although the bomb was not armed with the trigger (a removable capsule of fissionable material which was securely stored in a containment area on board the plane), it nevertheless contained a high-explosive detonator. It destroyed a local playhouse, near the residence of Walter Gregg, and leveled nearby trees. Nobody was killed by the blast but several people in Gregg's family were injured. The site is located near US 301, but is difficult to access due to the site being on private property.

Fragments of the bomb are on display at Florence County Museum.

References

External links 
 "Dead" A-Bomb Hits US Town, Universal Newsreel story, Internet Archive
 Only Atomic Bomb Ever Dropped on America, The HistoryPodcast 1

Unincorporated communities in Florence County, South Carolina
Unincorporated communities in South Carolina